is a Japanese science fiction writer and critic. Chiaki Kawamata has won both the Seiun Award and the Nihon SF Taisho Award. Chiaki Kawamata is also noted for writing the story of the manga Emblem of Roto.

Awards
 1981: Seiun Award Japanese Long Form Award for Kaseijin Senshi
 1984: Nihon SF Taisho for Genshigari

Works
 
English translations

 46 Okunen Monogatari ~The Shinka Ron~ (４６億年物語 －THE進化論－, "4.6 Billion Year Story: The Theory of Evolution") 1990 (Storywriter)

References

Entry in The Encyclopedia of Science Fiction

Japanese science fiction writers
Japanese speculative fiction critics
People from Otaru
Writers from Hokkaido
1948 births
Living people